The Internazionali di Tennis Città di Trieste is a professional tennis tournament played on clay courts. It is currently part of the ATP Challenger Tour. It is held annually in Trieste, Italy since 2020.

Past finals

Singles

Doubles

References

ATP Challenger Tour
Tennis tournaments in Italy
Sport in Trieste
Clay court tennis tournaments
Recurring sporting events established in 2020